Chartaprops 16 (Pty) Ltd and Another v Silberman is an important case in the South African law of agency. It was heard in the Supreme Court of Appeal by Scott JA, Nugent JA, Ponnan JA, Maya JA and Leach AJA on May 14, 2008. They delivered judgment on September 25. The case was an appeal from a decision in the Witwatersrand Local Division by Boruchowitz J.

Facts 
The respondent sued the appellants out of the High Court for her damages suffered as a result of injuries sustained when she slipped and fell in a shopping mall owned by the first appellant and cleaned by the second appellant. The respondent alleged that the second appellant was negligent in failing to detect and remove the spillage in the passage, and that the first appellant was vicariously liable for the negligence of the second appellant. At the conclusion of the trial, the High Court held that the appellants were jointly and severally liable to the respondent. The appellants appealed against that decision to the Supreme Court of Appeal.

Judgment 
The SCA held that the general rule was that a principal was not liable for the wrongs committed by an independent contractor or its employees. The courts have, however, been extending the principal's liability for the acts of independent contractors: a tendency which, if unchecked, would result in the creation of vicarious responsibility for every act of negligence performed by an independent contractor in the course of doing the work, thus effacing the distinction between principal and independent contractor.

The court held, further, that the concept of a non-delegable or "personal" duty had been designed to enable a plaintiff to outflank the general rule as stated above. The problem was that the classification in any particular circumstances of a duty as non-delegable amounted to an assertion without rational backing. The correct approach to the liability of a principal for the negligence of an independent contractor was to apply the fundamental rule that obliged everyone to exercise that degree of care that the circumstances demanded. That meant that, given that the first appellant's duty was to take care that the premises were safe, it was obliged to take no more than reasonable steps to guard against foreseeable harm to the public.

The court found that, by engaging a competent contractor, the first appellant took the care which was incumbent on it to make the premises reasonably safe. There was no way for the first appellant to have known that the second appellant's work would be defective. The first appellant had therefore not been negligent, and the damage complained of was caused solely by the negligent act or omission of the second appellant.

The SCA held, accordingly, that the court a quo had erred in holding the first appellant liable. Its finding in relation to the second appellant could, however, not be faulted. The appeal was thus upheld in part and dismissed in part.

See also 
 South African agency law

References 
 Alberts v Engelbrecht 1961 (2) SA 644 (T).
 Blore v Standard General Insurance Co Ltd en 'n Ander 1972 (2) SA 89 (O).
 Brauns v Shoprite Checkers (Pty) Ltd 2004 (6) SA 211 (E).
 Cape Town Municipality v Paine 1923 AD 207.
 Chartaprops 16 (Pty) Ltd and Another v Silberman 2009 (1) SA 265 (SCA).
 City of Salisbury v King 1970 (2) SA 528 (RA).
 Colonial Mutual Life Assurance Society Ltd v MacDonald 1931 AD 412.
 Compass Motors Industries (Pty) Ltd v Callguard (Pty) Ltd 1990 (2) SA 520 (W).
 Crawhall v Minister of Transport and Another 1963 (3) SA 614 (T).
 Dukes v Marthinusen 1937 AD 12.
 Gouda Boerdery BK v Transnet 2005 (5) SA 490 (SCA) ([2004] 4 All SA 500).
 Jones v Maceys of Salisbury (Pvt) Ltd 1982 (2) SA 139 (ZH).
 Knop v Johannesburg City Council 1995 (2) SA 1 (A).
 Kruger v Coetzee 1966 (2) SA 428 (A).
 Langley Fox Building Partnership (Pty) Ltd v De Valence 1991 (1) SA 1 (A).
 Lillicrap, Wassenaar and Partners v Pilkington Brothers (SA) (Pty) Ltd 1985 (1) SA 475 (A).
 Local Transitional Council of Delmas v Boshoff 2005 (5) SA 514 (SCA) ([2005] 4 All SA 175).
 McIntosh v Premier, KwaZulu-Natal and Another 2008 (6) SA 1 (SCA).
 Minister of Posts and Telegraphs v Johannesburg Consolidated Investment Co Ltd 1918 TPD 253.
 Minister of Safety and Security v Van Duivenboden 2002 (6) SA 431 (SCA) ([2002] 3 All SA 741).
 Monteoli v Woolworths (Pty) Ltd 2000 (4) SA 735 (W).
 Pretoria City Council v De Jager 1997 (2) SA 46 (A) ([1997] 1 All SA 635).
 Probst v Pick 'n Pay Retailers (Pty) Ltd [1998] 2 All SA 186 (W).
 Rhodes Fruit Farms Ltd and Others v Cape Town City Council 1968 (3) SA 514 (C).
 Saayman v Visser 2008 (5) SA 312 (SCA).
 Telematrix (Pty) Ltd t/a Matrix Vehicle Tracking v Advertising Standards Authority SA 2006 (1) SA 461 (SCA) ([2006] 1 All SA 6).
 Trustees, Two Oceans Aquarium Trust v Kantey & Templer (Pty) Ltd 2006 (3) SA 138 (SCA) ([2007] 1 All SA 240).
 Tsogo Sun Holdings (Pty) Ltd v Qing-He Shan and Another 2006 (6) SA 537 (SCA).
 Wagener v Pharmacare Ltd; Cuttings v Pharmacare Ltd 2003 (4) SA 285 (SCA).
 Australian Safeway Stores Proprietary Ltd v Zaluzna (1987) 162 CLR 479.
 Burnie Port Authority v General Jones Pty Ltd (1994) 179 CLR 520.
 Dalton v Angus (1881) 6 App Cas 740.
 Hardaker v Idle District Council [1896] 1 QB 335.
 Kondis v State Transport Authority (1984) 154 CLR 672.
 Leichhardt Municipal Council v Montgomery (2007) 230 CLR 22.
 Tarry v Ashton (1876) 1 QBD 314.
 The Pass of Ballater [1942] P 112.
 Turner v Arding & Hobbs Ltd [1949] 2 All ER 911 (KB).
 Voli v Inglewood Shire Council and Another (1963) 110 CLR 74.

Notes 

2008 in South African law
2008 in case law
South African case law